Cosmas Michael Angkur (born 4 January 1937) is an Indonesian Roman Catholic bishop.

Ordained to the priesthood on 14 July 1967, Angkur was named bishop of the Roman Catholic Diocese of Bogor, Indonesia on 10 June 1994 and retired on 21 November 2013.

References

External links

1937 births
Living people
People from Manggarai Regency
20th-century Roman Catholic bishops in Indonesia
Franciscan bishops
Indonesian Friars Minor
21st-century Roman Catholic bishops in Indonesia